British may refer to:

Peoples, culture, and language
 British people, nationals or natives of the United Kingdom, British Overseas Territories, and Crown Dependencies.
 British national identity, the characteristics of British people and culture
 British English, the English language as spoken and written in the United Kingdom or, more broadly, throughout the British Isles
 Celtic Britons, an ancient ethno-linguistic group
 Brittonic languages, a branch of the Insular Celtic language family (formerly called British)
 Common Brittonic, an ancient language

Other uses
Brit(ish), a 2018 memoir by Afua Hirsch
People or things associated with:
 Great Britain, an island
 United Kingdom, a sovereign state 
 Kingdom of Great Britain (1707–1800)
 United Kingdom of Great Britain and Ireland (1801–1922)

See also
 Terminology of the British Isles
 Alternative names for the British
 English (disambiguation)
 Britannic (disambiguation)
 British Isles
 Brit (disambiguation)
 Briton (disambiguation)
 Britain (disambiguation)
 Great Britain (disambiguation)
 British Empire
 United Kingdom (disambiguation)